This is a list of dentists who have gained a degree of notability, particularly with regard to the history of those in the field.

Real-life dentists

A
Sam Aanestad – former Californian politician
Harold Albrecht – Conservative Party of Canada politician
Tomas Albrektsson – implant dentistry
Henry Aldridge – politician from North Carolina
Bill Allen – former president of the British Dental Association.
Theodore C. Almquist – Brigadier General, US Air Force
Edward Angle – father of orthodontics
Arif Alvi – President of Pakistan 
Steve Arlin – became a dentist after playing Major League Baseball
Gunadasa Amarasekara – Sinhala language writer
Amalia Assur (1803–1889) first woman dentist in Sweden and possibly Europe.
Rafiuddin Ahmed (dentist) – Indian dentist. founded the First Dental College of India
Ana Bedran-Russo (Brazilian) Professor of Restorative Dentistry and Chair of the Department of General Dental Sciences in Restorative Dentistry at Marquette University School of Dentistry

B
Franz Bäke – Nazi Panzer ace
 Britt Baker – American professional wrestler currently performing with All Elite Wrestling; also has a full-time dental practice in Florida
Charles Spence Bate – authority on crustaceans, five species are named for him
William George Beers – established the Montreal Lacrosse Club and the Canada Journal of Dental Science
Samuel Bemis – photography pioneer who became an eccentric recluse
Gurbanguly Berdimuhamedow – President of Turkmenistan
André Bolhuis – Netherlands Field Hockey Player
Daniel Bukantz – American fencer
Paul Beresford – Conservative Party (UK) politician
David Bernier – Secretary of State of Puerto Rico
Greene Vardiman Black – invented a foot-driven dental drill and is classed as a father of modern dentistry
Robert Blake – wrote, An Essay on the Structure and Formation of the Teeth in Man and Various Animals.
Jan Boubli – French professional poker player and retired dentist
Allan G. Brodie – American dentist who established the Prize Essay Award to promote research
Edgar Buchanan – primarily known for his later career as an actor in shows like Petticoat Junction
Julius Bruck – also designed a water-cooled diaphanoscopic instrument for translumination of the bladder via the rectum
Martin van Butchell – Eccentric who put his wife's head on display at his home/practice after her death
Donald J. Butz – U.S. Air Force Major General

C
Héctor José Cámpora – President of Argentina
Billy Cannon – American football player and counterfeiter
Georg Carabelli – court dentist to the Austrian Emperor who founded a clinic in the University of Vienna
Gerald Cardinale – Republican Party (United States) politician with a dental office in Fort Lee, New Jersey
James Carlisle – Governor-General of Antigua and Barbuda and member of the British Dental Association
Allen M. Christensen – American politician, Utah state senator
Steve Christian – one of the Pitcairn Island sex abusers who did dentistry and was Mayor
Dipak Chudasama – cricketer called "The Doc" because he's a qualified dentist
Antoni Cieszyński – Polish head of a Stomatology Institute who was killed in the Massacre of Lwów professors
Bernard J. Cigrand – possibly the "Father of Flag Day"
Barney Clark – first recipient of the Jarvik 7 artificial heart
Henry D. Cogswell – designed a method of securing dental plates, and in the temperance movement
Frederick J. Conboy – secretary of the Ontario Dental Association and later mayor of Toronto
Pierre Corbeil – Canadian politician, Quebec cabinet minister
Dan Crane – American dentist/politician. Republican Party
Gerry Curatola

D
Miles Dewey Davis, Jr. – ran for a seat on the State Legislature, NAACP member, and father to Miles Davis
Bessie Delany – second black woman to be granted a dentistry license in New York state
G. Walter Dittmar – former president of the American Dental Association
Robert Dudley – actor
Winfield Dunn – governor of Tennessee

E
Bill Emmerson – California State Assembly member who had a 22-year practice
Saskia Estupiñán – Ecuadoran oral health researcher and advisor, known for her work with the World Health Organization
Thomas W. Evans – founded the University of Pennsylvania School of Dental Medicine

F
Sheila Faith – British politician of the Conservative party
Pierre Fauchard – wrote the first complete scientific description of dentistry
Rabab Fetieh – first Saudi female orthodontist
Charles Finnigan (1901–1967) – Surgeon Rear Admiral in the Royal Navy who was Honorary Dental Surgeon to the Queen from 1955 to 1960.
Alfred Fones (1869–1938) – came up with the name "dental hygienist" and founded that profession
Sten Forshufvud – Swedish dentist who drew on his professional knowledge when theorizing about the poisoning of Napoleon
Rosalie Fougelberg – early female dentist in Sweden

G
Samir Ghawshah – Leader of the Palestinian Popular Struggle Front
Michael Glick – dean of SUNY Buffalo Dental School
John Goodsir – wrote a noted essay on teeth
Paul Gosar – American politician, representative in Congress from Arizona
George Franklin Grant – first African-American professor at Harvard. He also invented a wooden golf tee.
Zane Grey – author of Riders of the Purple Sage and practicing dentist
William Guy – Scottish dentist, creator of the Dental Act of 1921 in UK

H
John "Dok" Hager – cartoonist whose nickname came from his days as a dentist
Jim Harrell, Jr. – past chairman of the American Dental Association Council on Governmental Affairs, and a Democratic Party (United States) politician
Chapin A. Harris – co-Founded the first dental school in the US, or possibly anywhere
Horace H. Hayden – architect of the American system of dental education & organizer of professional dentistry
Heimir Hallgrímsson – Icelandic football player and manager, former manager of the Iceland men's national football team, has practiced dentistry throughout his playing and managing career.
Harold G. Hillam – General Authority of LDS Church
Gay Hitler – Pickaway County, Ohio pioneer
John Henry "Doc" Holliday – Dentist and American Folklore icon, Gunfight at the O.K. Corral participant
Matthew Hopcraft – public dentistry expert and MasterChef Australia contestant
Les Horvath – winner of Heisman Trophy who became a dentist
Edward Hudson – eminent dentist when the field was new, he is also noted for making fake "ruins"
Lester C. Hunt – Democratic Party (United States) politician who served in the Dental Corps in World War I.(Committed suicide)

I
Francis Brodie Imlach – Scottish dental pioneer. First dentist to use chloroform as an anaesthetic

J
Cheddi Jagan – former president of Guyana
Fatima Jinnah – sister of Muhammad Ali Jinnah and "Mother of the Nation" in Pakistan

K
Scott Keadle – American politician from North Carolina
Erhard Keller – speed skater at the Winter Olympic Games and professional dentist for over thirty years
Ryan Kohlmeier – former professional baseball player in Major League Baseball
Michael Krop – Democratic Party (United States) politician with a school named for him
Peter Kunter – football player for Eintracht Frankfurt

L
Gordon R. Lawson -New Zealand rugby player
Donald Leake – dentist, inventor of the alloplastic tray, and oboist
 Charles Goodall Lee – first licensed dentist of Asian ancestry in the United States of America. He was a founder of Chinatown, Oakland, California, and helped fund the founding of the Chinese American Citizens Alliance
Robert Lee – African-American emigrant to Ghana.
 Hardy Limeback – proponent who led water fluoridation efforts in Canada
 Göran Lindblad – Swedish politician
 John Linder – American politician, representative in Congress
 Jim Lonborg – in the Boston Red Sox Hall of Fame, he is now a dentist
Mahlon Loomis – known for a wireless telegraph patent
Jiko Luveni – Fijian dentist who works on combatting AIDS
Alexander Gordon Lyle – United States Navy dentist and World War I Medal of Honor recipient and first military dentist to be promoted to Flag rank (Admiral/General).

M
Bernie Machen – president of University of Florida and University of Utah
Martin Marks
Edward Maynard – treated United States Congressmen and in 1888 he held the chair of Dental Theory and Practice at the National university in Washington. (Better known for firearms inventions)
Stanley McInnis – Canadian who moved a motion at a meeting of the Canadian Dental Association to adopt a code of ethics, also a politician
Markus Merk – FIFA referee from Germany
Ramón Mestre – former Governor of Córdoba
Frederick B. Morrehead – helped save the University of Illinois at Chicago College of Dentistry
Jack Miller – "racing dentist" who was in the Indianapolis 500
Bill Mlkvy – former professional basketball player for the Philadelphia Warriors
Mike Morton – football player

N
John Newbrough – of Oahspe
Phil Northrup – Spiritualist author
Charlie Norwood – served in the Dental Corps and was a member of the United States Congress
Hessam Nowzari – founder of the Taipei Academy of Reconstructive Dentistry in Taiwan
Frederick Bogue Noyes – organized the first course on dental pathology in the United States

O
Giovanni Battista Orsenigo – monk/dentist
Weedon E. Osborne – United States Navy dentist and World War I Medal of Honor recipient
Rodrigues Ottolengui – Sephardic Jewish dental pioneer who was one of the first to use X-rays (also wrote mystery novels)

P
Ron Packard – Navy Dental Corps and a private practice, he was later on the U.S. House Committee on Appropriations
Painless Parker – dentist and huckster
William Paulus – swimmer
Guillermo Peschard – Mexican founder of the UJED School of Dentistry 
Steve Petryk – curler
Rudy Perpich – American dentist/politician of the Minnesota Democratic-Farmer-Labor Party
William Albert Pommer – Canadian politician
Fritz Pfeffer – dentist who hid with Anne Frank

Q

R
Bessie Raiche – aviation pioneer
Earl W. Renfroe – broke barriers for African Americans, headed a dentistry department
Charles Richard – Canadian politician

S
Harry Sagansky – gangster trained in dentistry who had a practice
Ben L. Salomon – American military dentist and World War II Medal of Honor recipient
Hugo Sánchez – Mexican football player
Isaac Schour – former dean of the University of Illinois at Chicago College of Dentistry
Terry Schmidt – football player
Helen Rulison Shipley – first female dentist in Nevada
Mike Simpson – US representative from Idaho
Joseph Slogan – Canadian politician
John Smith (dentist) – founder of the Edinburgh school of dentistry
Mark Spitz – Olympic swimmer (was actually accepted to dental school, but competed in the Olympics instead)
Charles Stent – dentist who advanced Dentures making
Charles H. Strub – sports entrepreneur
Jon Sudbø – Norwegian dentist linked to a case of scientific misconduct

T
Lucy Hobbs Taylor – first female in the United States with a doctorate in dentistry
José Roberto Magalhães Teixeira – Brazilian politician
Mohamed Khir bin Toyo – Malaysian politician
Joseph Trumpeldor – Zionist national hero
Charles Murray Turpin – Republican politician in the United States House of Representatives

U

V

Mahesh Verma –  Indian prosthodontist and the Director and Principal of Maulana Azad Institute of Dental Sciences

W
Harold Gladstone Watkin (1882–1965) – orthodontist
John Weisbeck – Canadian politician
Thomas Bramwell Welch – founder of Welch's
Horace Wells – pioneered the use of anesthesia in dentistry, later committed suicide
Gerrit Wolsink – motocross racer

X

Y

W. J. Younger –  American dentist who performed some of the earliest and most groundbreaking research in the field of periodontology

Z
Leonie von Meusebach–Zesch – pioneer female dentist who practiced in Texas, Alaska, Arizona and California

Fictional dentists
 The aforementioned Britt Baker is routinely introduced in All Elite Wrestling as "Dr. Britt Baker, DMD", reflecting her real-life dental practice.
Jeremy Hillary Boob (voiced by Dick Emery) – from Yellow Submarine.
Matthew Brock – from NewsRadio. (Although he gave it up to work in radio and is only seen practicing in one episode)
Dr. Carey – from Stuart Little
Dr. Dillingham – from Prostho Plus.
Walt Duncan – head of the household at the centre of comic strip Zits.
Dr. Tariq Faraj – from Oz.
Dr. Barry Farber – Rachel's fiancé whom she left at the altar from Friends.
The unnamed W.C. Fields character in the 1932 short film The Dentist.
Bob Fish – a title character in Bob and Margaret.
  Wendell and Monica Wilkins: originally only named as Mr. and Mrs. Granger, parents of Hermione Granger – from the Harry Potter novels.
 Julia Harris – from the film Horrible Bosses.
Ben Harper – from British sitcom My Family.
Brock Hart – from the TV series Reba.
 Hermey the Elf – became a dentist in Rudolph the Red-Nosed Reindeer and the Island of Misfit Toys prior was an elf.
Jesse W. Heywood (Don Knotts) – from the 1968 comedy film The Shakiest Gun in the West, a remake of Bob Hope's The Paleface (1948).
Orson Hodge – from Desperate Housewives.
 Carl Howell (John Stamos) – from the TV series Glee.
Sheldon Kornpett (Alan Arkin) – Manhattan dentist in the 1979 comedy film The In-Laws.
Capt. Walter Koskiusko Waldowski, "Painless Pole" – in MASH.
Bernard Nadler – from the TV series Lost.
Nicholas "Oz" Oseransky – from The Whole Nine Yards and The Whole Ten Yards.
John Patterson – in For Better or For Worse.
Peter "Painless" Potter (Bob Hope) – from the 1948 comedy film The Paleface.  Bumbling dentist who was fooled into believing that he was a deadly gunfighter.
Lincoln Rice DDS – from Broad City.
 Jerry Robinson – orthodontist who shared the office suite on the Bob Newhart Show
 Miss Root – dentist in the book Demon Dentist by David Walliams
Dr. Frank Sangster – in Novocaine.
Orin Scrivello, D.D.S. (Steve Martin) – Little Shop of Horrors
Dr. Charley Shanowski (Ted McGinley) – from Hope & Faith
Eugene Sutphin (Sam Waterston) – from Serial Mom.
Christian Szell – from William Goldman's Marathon Man, later a movie by John Schlesinger
Noah Werner (Alan Tudyk) – Suburgatory (TV series) 
Tim Whatley (Bryan Cranston) and Mr. Abbot (Robert Wagner) – from the NBC sitcom Seinfeld, Whatley alleged to be an insincere convert to Judaism.
 Julian Winston – adulterer in the play ) and its film adaptation
Dr. Wolfe – from The Simpsons
Isaac Yankem, DDS – professional wrestler portrayed by Glenn Jacobs, now known as Kane, in the WWF

Other
Greeeen – four member Japanese pop music band consisting entirely of dentists who studied at Ohu University in Fukushima

References 

Dentists
Dentists
Dentists